New Hampshire Route 85 (abbreviated NH Route 85 or NH 85) is a  north–south state highway in Rockingham County in southeastern New Hampshire. It runs from Exeter to Newfields.

The southern terminus of NH 85 is in downtown Exeter at New Hampshire Route 27 and New Hampshire Route 111A.  The northern terminus is in Newfields at New Hampshire Route 108.

It runs along the west side of the Squamscott River for its entire length, opposite to NH 108, which runs east of the river.

Route description

NH 85 begins just west of downtown Exeter, at the intersection of Water Street and Main Street, although no signage is present. Heading westbound on Water Street, which initially carries NH 27 and NH 111A, these two routes transition over to Main Street, while Water Street splits off due north to carry NH 85.  On its way out of town, NH 85 interchanges with the Exeter-Hampton Expressway (NH 101) at exit 10, before entering the town of Newfields.  Continuing northbound, NH 85 intersects the eastern terminus of NH 87, a short route connecting with NH 125 in northern Epping.  The road turns northeast for its last mile and ends at an intersection with NH 108, which provides access to the closely neighboring towns of Newmarket and Stratham.

Junction list

References

External links

 New Hampshire State Route 85 on Flickr

085
Transportation in Rockingham County, New Hampshire